Caladenia longifimbriata, commonly known as the fringed spider orchid or green-comb spider orchid, is a rare species of orchid endemic to the south-west of Western Australia. It has a single, hairy leaf and one or two green, red and white flowers with a long labellum fringe and only occurs in a few scattered populations between Jerramungup and Esperance.

Description 
Flowering occurs from August to September.

Taxonomy and naming 
Caladenia longifimbriata was first described in 2001 by Stephen Hopper and Andrew Phillip Brown from a specimen collected near Jerramungup and the description was published in Nuytsia. The specific epithet (longifimbriata) is derived from the Latin words longus meaning "long" and fimbriatus meaning "fringed" or "fibrous" in reference to the long labellum fringe.

Distribution and habitat 
Fringed spider orchid occurs in scattered populations between Jerramungup and Esperance in the Esperance Plains and Mallee biogeographic regions where it grows in mallee woodland near temporary streams.

Conservation
Caladenia fimbriata is classified as "Priority One" by the Western Australian Government Department of Parks and Wildlife, meaning that it is known from only one or a few locations which are potentially at risk.

References

longifimbriata
Orchids of Western Australia
Endemic orchids of Australia
Plants described in 2001
Endemic flora of Western Australia
Taxa named by Stephen Hopper
Taxa named by Andrew Phillip Brown